Keith Samples (born 1955 or 1956) is an American filmmaker and former syndication executive.

He graduated in 1977 at the Texas Tech University and pursued a sports career.

He was founder of the film and television production company Rysher Entertainment. He was originally senior vice president of Lorimar-Telepictures, before landing a job at Warner Bros. Television and Walt Disney Television to help them develop projects for syndication.

During his time at Rysher Entertainment, he grew the company into the biggest movie-making producers in history, developing their own movie projects. On May 27, 1997, he  resigned from Rysher Entertainment and pursue his own projects. He went on to be a movie maker/television director/producer after leaving Rysher, starting his own production company to develop motion pictures and television shows.

For a short period of time, in 2008, he worked at Media Rights Capital's television division. He infamously developed The CW's own Sunday night programming block under a time-lease agreement, but it flopped after a few viewings and poor ratings. He was fired after only a few months working at MRC.

Filmography

Film and Short Film
 Above Suspicion (1995)
 Big Night (1996)
 The Death and Life of Bobby Z (2007)
 Election (1999)
 Love Lies Bleeding (2008)
 Single White Female 2: The Psycho (2005)
 A Smile Like Yours (1997)
 Switchback (1997)
 Walking Tall (2004)

Television
 Everwood
 Felicity
 Freddy's Nightmares
 Haven
 The O.C.
 One Tree Hill
 Oz
 The Practice

References

External links
 
 

American film directors
American film producers
American media executives
American television directors
American television producers
Living people
Place of birth missing (living people)
1950s births
Year of birth uncertain